Mohamed Ameur (born November 11, 1984) is an Algerian race walker. Ameur competed in the 20 km Walk at the 2008 Olympic Games, he finished at a time of 1:32:21 and finished in 48th place.

Competition record

External links

1984 births
Living people
Algerian male racewalkers
Olympic athletes of Algeria
Athletes (track and field) at the 2008 Summer Olympics
Athletes (track and field) at the 2015 African Games
African Games bronze medalists for Algeria
African Games medalists in athletics (track and field)
21st-century Algerian people
20th-century Algerian people